Samford Valley is a rural locality in the Moreton Bay Region, Queensland, Australia. It is one of two localities in the town of Samford, the other being Samford Village.

Geography 
The mountainous terrain is mostly undeveloped.

The South Pine River rises in Mount Nebo to the west and flows east through neighbouring Highvale into Samford Valley, exiting to Draper in the north-east. The land use on the valley floor is predominantly rural residential (housing on large land parcels).

History 
In 1981, the locality of Samford was split into two localities: Samford Village around the town and Samford Valley wrapping around the village to the west, north, and east.

Education 
There are no schools in Samford Valley. The nearest government primary school is Samford State School in neighbouring Samford Village. The nearest government secondary school is Ferny Grove State High school in Ferny Grove to the south-east. Samford Valley Steiner School is in neighbouring Wights Mountain.

Community 
The Samford Support Network is a group of volunteers providing a variety of services to community members who are ill, elderly, living with a disability, or struggling.

References 

Suburbs of Moreton Bay Region
Localities in Queensland